The Springfield Cardinals was the final name of a minor league baseball team based in Springfield, Ohio, between 1933 until 1942. The team was a member of the Middle Atlantic League throughout its existence. The club was originally formed in 1933 as the Springfield Chicks and affiliate of the Washington Senators. The next season the team's name changed to the Springfield Pirates after their new affiliate, the Pittsburgh Pirates. After a one-year hiatus, the team took the field as the Springfield Indians and were affiliated with the Cleveland Indians. Finally in 1941 the team spent its final two years associated with the St. Louis Cardinals before folding with the league in 1942.

References

Baseball teams established in 1933
Baseball teams disestablished in 1942
Cleveland Guardians minor league affiliates
Pittsburgh Pirates minor league affiliates
St. Louis Cardinals minor league affiliates
Washington Senators minor league affiliates
Defunct minor league baseball teams
1933 establishments in Ohio
1942 disestablishments in Ohio
Springfield, Ohio
Defunct baseball teams in Ohio
Middle Atlantic League teams